Butyrskaya prison, usually known simply as Butyrka, is a prison in the Tverskoy District of central Moscow, Russia. In Imperial Russia it served as the central transit prison. During the Soviet Union era (1917-1991) it held many political prisoners.  Butyrka remains the largest of Moscow's remand prisons. Overcrowding is an ongoing problem.

History

The first references to Butyrka prison may be traced back to the 17th century. The current building was erected in 1879 near the Butyrsk gate (or Butyrskaya zastava) on the site of a prison-fortress which had been built by the architect Matvei Kazakov during the reign of Catherine the Great. The towers of the old fortress once housed the rebellious Streltsy during the reign of Peter I, and later on hundreds of participants of the 1863 January Uprising in Poland. Members of Narodnaya Volya were also prisoners of the Butyrka in 1883, as were the participants in the Morozov Strike of 1885. The Butyrka prison was known for its brutal regime. The prison administration resorted to violence anytime the inmates tried to protest.

Its famous inmates include the influential revolutionary poet Vladimir Mayakovsky, the Russian revolutionary Nikolay Bauman, and the founder of the KGB Felix Dzerzhinsky. During the February Revolution, the workers of Moscow freed all the political prisoners from the Butyrka. Following the October Revolution, Butyrka remained a place of internment for political prisoners and a transfer camp for people sentenced to be sent to the Gulag. During the Great Purge, about twenty thousand inmates at a time were imprisoned in Butyrka. Thousands of political prisoners were shot after investigations. Later, prominent political prisoners included the writers Aleksandr Solzhenitsyn and Yevgenia Ginzburg.

Living conditions 

Varlam Shalamov notes in one of his tales, that the Butyrka is extremely hot in summer; Eduard Limonov, in his drama Death in the Police Van, emphatically agrees. He says that, with the collapse of the Soviet regime, overcrowding has become a real issue; there are more than one hundred inmates in cells meant to contain ten people. Most of these people are politically unreliable subjects from the Caucasus. Since epidemics are a problem, the wardens try to fill cells entirely with people with AIDS, or with tuberculosis; however, this does little to curb the problem, since many inmates are drug users, and there is at most one needle per cell. Moreover, inmates are brought to the tribunal in overcrowded police vans, so that healthy inmates are exposed to tuberculosis.

Butyrka has its own slang: the wardens are called "menti" (Russian: менты), the inmates "patzani" (пацаны), and to take drugs is "vmazatsia" (вмазаться). The word "khuy" (хуй) is used profusely. On a lighter note, television has been allowed since 1995.

Notable inmates
 Fabijan Abrantovich, Catholic priest and a pro-independence activist from Belarus
 Anna Abrikosova, nun of the Dominican Order and prominent figure in the Catholic Church in Russia
 Andrei Amalrik, Russian historian and famed dissident during the 1960s; author of "Will the Soviet Union Survive Until 1984"
 Władysław Anders, Polish general and prime minister
 Valery Asratyan, serial killer, executed in 1996
 Isaak Babel, writer, killed in 1940
 Aron Baron, Ukrainian anarchist
 Mieczysław Boruta-Spiechowicz, Polish general and one of the leaders of anti-communist opposition in the 1970s
 Alikhan Bukeikhanov, Kazakh statesman
 Walerian Czuma, Polish general
 Felix Dzerzhinsky, Cheka founder
 Vladimir Dzhunkovsky, Russian statesman
 Yuli-Yoel Edelstein (is an Israeli politician. One of the most prominent refuseniks in the Soviet Union, he has been Speaker of the Knesset since 2013
 Blessed Leonid Feodorov, Exarch and reputed bishop of the Russian Greek Catholic Church
 Rashid Khan Gaplanov, Education and Finance Minister of Azerbaijan Democratic Republic
 Yevgenia Ginzburg, author of Journey into the Whirlwind and Within the Whirlwind; mother of the writer Vasili Aksyonov; her books tell of her arrest during the 1937 purges in the city of Kazan, where she worked as a leading member of the local Communist Party structures of Tartary
 Filipp Goloshchyokin, Soviet politician and party leader, was briefly held in Butyrka and sent to Kuibyshev and shot there in October 1941
 Sergey Golovkin, serial killer and the last person to be executed in Russia
 Dmitry Pavlovich Grigorovich, aircraft designer
 Vladimir Gusinsky, led to the "shares for freedom" transaction or Protocol No.6 (Протокол N.6. Доля свободы) that was signed by Minister for Press, Broadcasting and Mass Communications of the Russian Federation, Mikhail Lesin
 Werner Haase, one of Adolf Hitler's personal physicians, died in captivity in 1950
 Heinz Hitler, German dictator Adolf Hitler's favorite nephew, died after several days of torture in 1942
 Bruno Jasieński, Polish poet and futurist, killed in 1938
 Elena Karpuchina, the 1967 World Rhythmic Gymnastics Champion, born in 1951 and spent her first two years living in Butyrki until her mother's pardon in 1953
 Aleksandr Kokorin, Russian footballer
 Sergei Korolev, Russian rocket and spacecraft designer
 Walter Linse, German human rights lawyer kidnapped in the American sector of Berlin in July 1952, executed 15 December 1953
 Alexander Litvinenko
 Blessed Zygmunt Łoziński, Catholic bishop of Minsk
 Sergei Magnitsky, lawyer, whose 2009 death in Matrosskaya Tishina Prison led to a 2009 Russian law forbidding jailing of tax criminals and also to the Magnitsky Act being passed by the US Congress in 2012.
 Nestor Makhno, Ukrainian anarchist
 Pavel Mamayev, Russian footballer
 Vladimir Mayakovsky, poet
 Günther Merk, SS-Brigadeführer and war criminal, executed in January 1947
 Leopold Okulicki, Polish general, last commander of the Armia Krajowa, killed in Butyrki in 1946
 Konstantin Päts, president of the Republic of Estonia when it became occupied by the Soviet Union in 1940
 Nikolai Polikarpov, Soviet aeronautical engineer
 Yevgeny Polivanov, Soviet linguist, orientalist and polyglot who was executed in 1938
 Yemelyan Pugachev, pretender to the Russian throne and leader of a Cossack insurrection in 1773–1774
 Varlam Shalamov, writer and soviet dissident; wrote The Kolyma Tales
 Kazys Skučas, Lithuanian politician and general of the Lithuanian Army
 Aleksandr Solzhenitsyn, Nobel Prize laureate, writer and dissident; wrote The Gulag Archipelago and One Day in the Life of Ivan Denisovich
 Elena Stasova, Russian communist
 Karlo Štajner, Yugoslav communist activist and writer
 Baruch Steinberg, Chief Rabbi of the Polish Army
 Léon Theremin, a pioneer of electronic music, the inventor of the theremin and an electronic eavesdropping bug
 Sergei Tretyakov, Avant-Garde playwright during the 1920s; apparently threw himself down a prison stairwell to avoid execution
 Augustinas Voldemaras, once the prime minister of Lithuania, died in this prison after Lithuania was occupied by the Soviet Union in 1940
 Avgustyn Voloshyn, former president of Carpatho-Ukraine, died in Butyrka in 1945
 Helmuth Weidling, German Wehrmacht general and last commandant of Berlin, died in custody in 1955
 Jonas Žemaitis, Lithuanian general, head of the Lithuanian anti-Soviet partisan forces after World War II, shot to death in 1953; later recognized as the fourth President of Lithuania in 2009

References

External links

  
 Former Butyrka inmate says: "They throw you there to break you" - interview on Radio Free Europe 
 Article of the political prisoner's department of the Russian mypeople.ru
 Article of Rossiskaja Gaseta 
 A list of prisons in Moscow 
 BBC report about Butyrka prison at Johnson's Russia list
 Unofficial website of workers of The Russian Federal Penitentiary Service 

Buildings and structures in Moscow
Castles in Russia
Prisons in Russia
Prisons in the Soviet Union
Tverskoy District
Cultural heritage monuments of federal significance in Moscow